Emu apple is a common name for several species of plants and may refer to:

 Kunzea pomifera, also known as native cranberries
 Owenia acidula, a hallucinogenic plant found in Australia
 Owenia vernicosa, a plant found in Australia